Best Of Three is a compilation of the three Coney Hatch albums, released in 1992, which includes two previously unreleased songs; "Where I Draw The Line" and "Fuel For The Fire".

Track listing
 4:28 - Devil's Deck  
 3:29 - You Ain't Got Me
 3:34 - Stand Up *
 3:17 - Hey Operator
 4:17 - Monkey Bars *
 3:55 - Where I Draw The Line
 4:12 - Don't Say Make Me
 3:34 - Shake It *
 3:52 - First Time For Everything
 3:00 - Some Like It Hot *
 4:16 - To Feel The Feeling Again
 4:09 - This Ain't Love
 3:22 - Wrong Side Of Town *
 4:07 - Girl From Last Night's Dream
 4:18 - Fantasy
 4:43 - He's A Champion
 4:07 - Fuel For The Fire

1992 greatest hits albums
Coney Hatch albums
Albums produced by Max Norman